Colobothea fasciata is a species of beetle in the family Cerambycidae. It was described by Bates in 1865. It is known from Argentina, Brazil and Paraguay.

References

fasciata
Beetles described in 1865